Desirable may refer to:
 something that is considered a favorable outcome, see e.g. best response
 Desirable (film)
 Desirable (horse), a racehorse

See also 
 Desire (disambiguation)